Hubert J. "Bud" Loftus (September 29, 1924 – May 24, 1995) was an American lawyer and politician.

Born in Chicago, Illinois, Loftus served in the United States Army Air Corps during World War II. He received his bachelor's and master's degrees from Southern Illinois University. Loftus then received his law degree from John Marshall Law School in 1955 and was admitted to the Illinois bar. In 1957, Loftus moved to Addison, Illinois and joined Bill Redmond's law firm which grew into Loftus, Riggs, Redmond and Duff, Ltd. During his legal career, he worked as the city attorney for Addison and Oakbrook Terrace, attorney for the Addison Park District, and as a special assistant attorney general for the State of Illinois.

Loftus joined the local Democratic Party serving as Vice Chair of the DuPage County Democratic Party and as Chairman of the Addison Township Democratic Organization. In the 1964 general election, Loftus was the Democratic candidate for DuPage County State's Attorney. In 1966, he ran for the Illinois House of Representatives, winning the Democratic primary, but finishing fourth of fourth for the three seats. In 1974, he ran for the state senate seat being vacated by Jack T. Knuepfer. In the Democratic wave year, he held future Senate President Pate Philip to the lowest win margin of his political career. Loftus was a delegate for Jimmy Carter during the 1980 Democratic primary and hosted Carter at his Addison home in October.

Loftus was appointed to the Illinois House of Representatives in January 1982 to succeed former Speaker and his law partner William A. Redmond. He lost in the new, heavily Republican single member district to Lee A. Daniels. Prior to the Cutback Amendment, Democrats in DuPage County had previously been able to win one of a House district's three seats due to cumulative voting in multi-member districts.

In 1986, Loftus was one of three candidates found highly qualified by the DuPage County Bar Association, but was not selected for one of three associate judgeship vacancies.

Loftus died at his home in Addison, Illinois on May 26, 1995.

Notes

External links

1924 births
1995 deaths
People from Addison, Illinois
Politicians from Chicago
Military personnel from Illinois
United States Army Air Forces soldiers
Southern Illinois University alumni
John Marshall Law School (Chicago) alumni
Illinois lawyers
Democratic Party members of the Illinois House of Representatives
20th-century American politicians
20th-century American lawyers